Xpress may refer to:

Xpress (TV series), an award-winning multi cultural entertainment series 
Xpress, a regional passenger bus service provided by the Georgia Regional Transportation Authority in metropolitan Atlanta
X*Press X*Change, an obsolete computer-based news-ticker-style newsfeed service 
XPress Telecom, a wireless telecommunication provider in Jordan
X-Press 2, an electronic and dance music trio from England
Xpress 200 and Xpress 3200, computer chipsets by ATI Technologies
Xpress 400, a plan for tolled express lanes on Interstate 4 through Orlando, Florida
Xpress technology, a Broadcom's standards-based frame-bursting approach to improve 802.11g wireless LAN performance
Xpress Motorsports, a NASCAR Craftsman Truck Series team
FICO Xpress, a suite of mathematical modeling and optimization tools 
Xpress Radio, a student radio station based in Cardiff
Xpress Transport Protocol, a transport layer protocol for high-speed networks
XPRESS, UAE a weekly tabloid newspaper in the United Arab Emirates
 a Trans-Proteomic Pipeline software
 XPRESS, the name for two different fast compression algorithms developed by Microsoft:
 one is used in Microsoft Exchange's LDAP protocol, Windows CE, and the Windows hibernation file
 the other is used in the Windows Imaging Format and the Distributed File System Replication Protocol
Xpress (roller coaster) a roller coaster in Walibi Holland.
Nokia Xpress, a web browser
 X Press, a British publishing company founded in 1992 by Dotun Adebayo and Steve Pope

Xpress may also refer to:

Desi Xpress, a former national weekly entertainment newspaper published in the UK
X-Press Feeders, a Singaporean shipping company which uses the ship moniker X-Press
Fitzroy Xpress, an Australian Aboriginal country rock band
FlyAsianXpress, a Malaysian regional airliner
Guitar Xpress, an original series on the Video On Demand network Mag Rack
MP Xpress, a steel inverted roller coaster located in Moviepark Germany
Ottawa XPress, an alternative newsweekly
Nashville Xpress, a former American minor league baseball team based in Nashville, Tennessee
Scheidt & Bachmann Ticket XPress, a passenger-operated, self-service railway ticket issuing system 
QuarkXPress, a professional page layout application
Golden Gate XPress, the newspaper of San Francisco State University
Desert Xpress or XpressWest, former names for Brightline West, a planned high-speed train service from California to Nevada

See also

 
 
 
 
 
 
 
 Express (disambiguation)
 Press (disambiguation)
 X (disambiguation)